The head of the Prime Minister's military cabinet (Chef du cabinet militaire du Premier ministre) is a role in the military and government of France, heading the prime minister's military cabinet.

List of office holders

References

French military staff